Željko Đokić (also transliterated Željko Djokić; born 10 May 1982) is a Serbian-born Bosnian-Herzegovinian former footballer who played as a defender.

Club career
Đokić played in the Second League of Serbia and Montenegro with FK Srem Jakovo in 2001. He played abroad in 2003 in the Macedonian First Football League with Pobeda. During his tenure with Pobeda he featured in the 2004–05 UEFA Champions League, and played against FC Pyunik. He also played in the 2006 UEFA Intertoto Cup against SSC Farul Constanța. In 2007, he played in the Serbian First League with Srem Jakovo, and Javor Ivanjica.

In 2009, he played abroad once more with Panthrakikos F.C. in the Superleague Greece. He returned to Javor Ivanjica in 2010 to play in the Serbian SuperLiga. In 2011, he played in the Ekstraklasa with Ruch Chorzów. During his time with Ruch Chorzów he played in the 2012–13 UEFA Europa League against FK Metalurg Skopje, and FC Viktoria Plzeň. After a brief stint with Javor Ivanjica he was playing abroad once more in the Austrian Football Bundesliga with FC Wacker Innsbruck in 2014.

In 2015, he returned to the Serbian Superliga to play with FK Novi Pazar, and later in the Premier League of Bosnia and Herzegovina with FK Borac Banja Luka. In 2016, he returned to the Serbian First League with FK Zemun. He played in abroad for the fifth time in 2018 to play in the Canadian Soccer League with Brantford Galaxy.

International career
He has played for Bosnia and Herzegovina B team.

References

External links
 
 
 
 
 Željko Đokić at Utakmica.rs 

1982 births
Living people
Footballers from Novi Sad
Association football central defenders
Serbian footballers
Bosnia and Herzegovina footballers
FK Srem Jakovo players
FK Pobeda players
FK Javor Ivanjica players
Panthrakikos F.C. players
Ruch Chorzów players
FC Wacker Innsbruck (2002) players
FK Novi Pazar players
FK Borac Banja Luka players
FK Zemun players
Brantford Galaxy players
Second League of Serbia and Montenegro players
Macedonian First Football League players
Serbian First League players
Super League Greece players
Serbian SuperLiga players
Ekstraklasa players
Austrian Football Bundesliga players
Premier League of Bosnia and Herzegovina players
Canadian Soccer League (1998–present) players
Bosnia and Herzegovina expatriate footballers
Expatriate footballers in North Macedonia
Bosnia and Herzegovina expatriate sportspeople in North Macedonia
Expatriate footballers in Greece
Bosnia and Herzegovina expatriate sportspeople in Greece
Expatriate footballers in Poland
Bosnia and Herzegovina expatriate sportspeople in Poland
Expatriate footballers in Austria
Bosnia and Herzegovina expatriate sportspeople in Austria
Expatriate soccer players in Canada
Bosnia and Herzegovina expatriate sportspeople in Canada